Mollakendi is a town (belde) in Elazığ District, Elazığ Province, Turkey. Its population is 2,214 (2021).

References

Towns in Turkey
Populated places in Elazığ Province
Elazığ District